Tanvir Gill is a news anchor at CNBC, Asia's most watched business and financial news network. She was previously an anchor at ET Now, the leading business channel of The Economic Times, India's largest selling financial daily, from The Times Group. She had a brief stint with Gaon Connection as well.

At ET NOW, she led coverage of global markets, having interviewed influential global investors & economists like Warren Buffett, Howard Marks, Ray Dalio, Mohnish Pabrai, Gopichand Hinduja, Mohamed El Erian, Rakesh Jhunjhunwala, Guy Spier, Marc Faber, Bob Doll, Jim O'Neill, Nouriel Roubini, Raghuram Rajan, Mark Mobius, Vinod Khosla, Russell Napier, Byron Wien, Stephen S. Roach, Wilbur Ross and Chris Wood.  She has interviewed chief investment officers and top fund managers from some of world's largest asset management companies like BlackRock, PIMCO, State Street Global Advisors, Goldman Sachs Asset Management, Fidelity Worldwide Investment, Vontobel Asset Management, Aberdeen Asset Management, JP Morgan Asset Management, Allianz Global Investors, and Oppenheimer Asset Management.

Having joined ET Now since 2009, Tanvir had been part of the core editorial team driving content on a daily basis during market hours. She anchored "Market Sense", analyzing global & India specific macro economic trends & "Closing Trades" that tracks the last hour market action in India. She has worked with Reuters in New York & London for her international global market series, Global Mantra Market Outlook & The FII View. She has interviewed some of the largest & most influential investors & economists as part of these series.

Before joining ET Now she worked with CNBC-TV18 from 2006-2009. 
Tanvir completed her graduation in commerce from Jesus Mary College & MBA in finance from Delhi University. She is an NCFM-NSE certified mutual fund advisor. While at CNBC-TV18, she hosted morning band shows like Your Stocks and Mid Cap Radar. She also anchored the hugely popular segment, "Saas Bahu Sensex", that gave investment advise to women investors all over India. She also provided India reports for the CNBC Worldwide programs CNBC Cash Flow and CNBC Capital Connection.
In Nov 2015 Tanvir covered PM Narendra Modi's historic visit to the UK interviewing policy makers like Priti Patel, Employment Minister UK Government, Lord Jim O'Neill, Commercial Secy UK Treasury, Lord Mayor of London Allan Yarrow & top markets speakers as also economists & corporate honchos in Lord Meghnad Desai, Sunil Bharti Mittal, Victorio Colao, GP Hinduja, Baba Kalyani, Vindi Banga, Tulsi Tanti among others. She was the only Indian business journalist to cover the G 20 Summit in Antalya Turkey for Times Now & ET Now.

In Jan 2016 Tanvir hosted The Economic Times Global Business Summit. In attendance were PM Narendra Modi, Finance minister Arun Jaitley and other cabinet minister like Mr Jayant Sinha, global CEOs including Andrew Witty of GlaxoSmithKline, Dominic Barton of McKinsey & Company, and speakers like Nassim Nicholas Taleb. In July 2016 Tanvir covered the Brexit vote & its implications as it happened from Canary Wharf in London getting the big investors to react on the big event. In May 2017, Tanvir covered the coveted Berkshire Hathaway Shareholders Meeting 2017 for viewers & readers of the Times of India Group.

In February 2019, Gill returned to CNBC, this time as anchor and reporter for its Singapore-based Asia network.  On 2 December of the same year, she became co-anchor of the Asia version of Street Signs.

References

External links
 

Date of birth missing (living people)
Year of birth missing (living people)
Living people
CNBC global channels
Delhi University alumni
Indian business and financial journalists
Indian television news anchors